Papelucho and the Martian (Spanish: Papelucho y el Marciano) is a feature-length Chilean animated film, created by Cine Animadores and Canal 13 Films, released on 17 May 2007.

The movie is based on the original Chilean novel books Papelucho created in 1947 by Marcela Paz and is specifically loosely based on the ninth book of the series, Papelucho and the Martian.

Plot
Excited to learn everything about Martians, Papelucho sets out to catch one using his experiments. One day, he is surprised to find an actual Martian named Det, a curious Martian child, and without thinking, Det introduces himself to Papelucho by entering his body.

Papelucho and Det establish a deep friendship as they live together inside Papelucho's veins. However, Papelucho realizes that Det cannot continue living on Earth and needs to return to Mars. To help Det get home, Papelucho decides to build a spaceship to fly to Mars and bring his friend back home, without knowing what will happen to him once they arrive.

Production
Papelucho series is one of the most popular children's book in Chile. Cine Animadores, after their local success with Ogu and Mampato in Rapa Nui started the production of the film in 2005 with the financial help of Canal 13 Films, using 1.5 million dollars in budget. The most notable difference between Papelucho and the Martian and Ogu and Mampato in Rapa Nui is the use of CG scenes mixed with traditional animation at the same time.

The film was very loosely based on the book of the same name Papelucho y el Marciano written by Marcela Paz in 1968 because is one of the most popular books of Papelucho line and also because of his sci-fi themes. The film was fully animated and produced in Chile, but it was dubbed in Mexico with recognized voice actors like Marina Huerta, Mario Castañeda and Maggie Vera, although Mexican voice actors maintained some Chilean Spanish slangs.

The movie was received with mostly moderate to bad reviews by critics.

References

External links
  (archived on the Wayback Machine)
 

2007 films
2007 animated films
Chilean animated science fiction films
2000s Spanish-language films
Animated films based on children's books

es:Papelucho#Película